Instruments used specially in Endocrinology  are as follows:



Instrument list

See also
List of surgical instruments
Instruments used in internal medicine

References 

Medical equipment
Endocrinology